Celeribacter halophilus is a Gram-negative and non-motile bacterium from the genus of Celeribacter which has been isolated from seawater from the coastal region of Qingdao in China.

References

Rhodobacteraceae
Bacteria described in 2012